Colleen Marie Haskell (born December 6, 1976) is an American former reality show contestant, actress, and producer. She was a contestant on the first season of the American reality show Survivor in 2000. She also co-starred in the comedy film The Animal.

Career
Haskell was a contestant on the original season of Survivor in 2000. She was a castaway on the Pagong tribe. Haskell was the last remaining original Pagong member to be voted out and became the fourth member of the jury.

Haskell was expected to reappear on Survivor during the All-Stars edition in 2004. Producer Mark Burnett later confirmed that Haskell was offered a spot on the show, but she turned down the offer, saying that she had "moved on with her life and just genuinely didn't want to go through that again".

In 2001, Haskell starred in the feature film comedy The Animal, playing Rianna, the love interest of Rob Schneider's character.

Haskell also appeared in an episode of That '70s Show as a love interest of Hyde. In 2002, Haskell appeared in the TV show Maybe It's Me. She worked as an assistant producer on The Michael Essany Show in 2003 before leaving the entertainment industry.

Filmography

References

External links

Colleen Haskell biography for Survivor: Borneo at CBS.com

1976 births
American film actresses
Living people
People from Bethesda, Maryland
Survivor (American TV series) contestants
University of Georgia alumni
21st-century American women